Jena Louise Cogswell (born November 2, 1979) is an American former soccer player who played as a midfielder, making 24 appearances for the United States women's national team.

Career
Kluegel played for the Mahtomedi Zephyrs in high school, where she was Parade Co-Player of the Year in 1998 and an All-American in 1996, 1997, and 1998 after the team won the state championship in 1997. She was also an All-State cross country and track runner, winning the Minnesota state championship in 800 metres in 1994. She also played for the youth club Saint Paul Blackhawks SC. In college, she played for the North Carolina Tar Heels, winning the NCAA championship in 1999 and 2000. She was Soccer America First-Team All-American in 2001, and an NSCAA Third-Team All-American in 2000 and 2001. She was a letter-winner at the school and was included in the NCAA All-Tournament Team in 1999, 2000, and 2001. In total, she scored 25 goals and recorded 45 assists in 98 appearances for the Tar Heels.

Kluegel began with the U.S. under-18 national team at the 1999 Pan American Games in Winnipeg, Canada, where the team won the gold medal against senior national teams. She later played for the under-21 national team, winning the Nordic Cup in 2001. She made her international debut for the United States senior team on February 9, 2000 in a friendly match against Norway. In total, she made 24 appearances for the U.S. and scored 1 goal, earning her final cap on February 16, 2003 in a friendly match against Iceland.

In club soccer, Kluegel played for the Boston Breakers of the Women's United Soccer Association from 2002 to 2003, where she made 39 appearances and recorded 6 assists.

In 2013, she was inducted into the Mahtomedi High School Athletic Hall of Fame.

Personal life
Kluegel was born in Saint Paul, Minnesota, though Mahtomedi is her hometown.

Career statistics

International

International goals

References

External links
 

1979 births
Living people
Sportspeople from Saint Paul, Minnesota
Soccer players from Minnesota
American women's soccer players
United States women's international soccer players
Women's association football midfielders
North Carolina Tar Heels women's soccer players
Boston Breakers (WUSA) players
Women's United Soccer Association players
Footballers at the 1999 Pan American Games
Pan American Games medalists in football
Pan American Games gold medalists for the United States
Medalists at the 1999 Pan American Games